General Sir John Garvock  (15 March 1817 – 10 November 1878) was a British Army General who achieved high office in the 1860s.

Garvock, the only son of Maj. John Garvock of the Royal Horse Guards and his wife, Margaret, was born in Kennington, Surrey, in 1817.

Military career
Garvock was commissioned into the 10th Regiment of Foot in 1835. By 1839 he was serving as an Adjutant in the 10th Regiment of Foot. He went on to command 2nd Infantry Brigade at Shorncliffe in October 1860 and 1st Infantry Brigade at Dover in July 1861.

In 1863 he took command of the Eusufzye Field Force, a formation which conducted a foray against Hindustani tribesmen in Umbela (now Ambela) in the North West Frontier during what is now known as the Ambela Campaign. He was appointed General Officer Commanding Northern District in England in October 1866 and General Officer Commanding Southern District in July 1877.

He was subsequently Colonel of the 89th Foot and then the 10th Foot.

References

 

|-

|-

1817 births
Military personnel from Surrey
1878 deaths
British Army generals
Knights Grand Cross of the Order of the Bath
Royal Irish Fusiliers officers
Royal Lincolnshire Regiment officers
British military personnel of the Umbeyla Campaign